DYRF may refer to the following:
DYRF-AM, 1215 kHz in Cebu City, branded on-air as Radio Fuerza
DYRF-FM, 99.5 MHz in Iloilo, branded on-air as Star FM Iloilo
DYRF-TV, channel 28 in Dumaguete, affiliate station of GMA News TV